Spartaks Rīga is a defunct Soviet Latvian football club. It was founded in 1945 and its manager was the popular Juris Rēdlihs (Raiskums).

Team history

The team played in the Soviet Latvian league from 1946 to 1954. The first seasons were difficult - 6th place (from 8 teams), 7th (from 7), only in 1948 it managed finishing in the upper part of the league table - 5th from 12 teams. In 1949 - 4th, but 1950 was a massive drawback - only 13th place among 17 teams. Spartaks missed the 1951 season to return as 3rd in 1952. Under the name Spartaks-Elektro the club had its best result in the league - they were runners-up in 1953. However the 1954 season proved to be the last for Spartaks Rīga - after a disappointing 9th place out of 10 teams the club was disbanded.

In 1948 Spartaks participated in the championship for Spartak teams from the entire USSR and got 6th place. In 1949 Spartaks played in the Latvian Cup final.

The most noticeable player of Spartaks Rīga was its goalkeeper, Arvīds Strikers, who in 1950 was a candidate to play for FK Daugava Rīga.

Honours
Latvian SSR Top League:
Runners-up: 1953
Latvian Cup:
'''Runners-up: 1949

References

Defunct football clubs in Latvia
1945 establishments in Latvia
1954 disestablishments in Latvia
Association football clubs established in 1945
Association football clubs disestablished in 1954
Sport in Riga